A heart is a muscular organ that pumps blood in various species.

Heart may also refer to:
Heart symbol, a symbol (♥) representing love, the organ, or a card suit
A synonym for soul

Film and television
Heart (1987 film), an American film
Heart (1999 film), a British film
Heart (2006 film), an Indonesian film
"Heart" (Glee), an episode of Glee
"Heart" (Supernatural), an episode of Supernatural

Literature 
Heart (novel), an 1886 children's book by Edmondo De Amicis
The Heart (novel), a 2014 novel by Maylis de Kerangal
Heart (journal), a journal covering cardiovascular medicine and surgery
Clinical Science (journal) or Heart, an academic journal

Music

Bands
Heart (band), an American rock band

Albums
Heart (L'Arc-en-Ciel album) (1998)
Heart (Audrey Assad album) (2012)
Heart (Eric Church album) (2021)
Heart (The City Harmonic album) (2013)
Heart (Elisa album) (2009)
Heart (Heart Evangelista album) (2003)
The Heart (album), a 2010 album by Jimmy Gnecco
Heart (Heart album) (1985)
Heart (Amanda Lear album) (2001)
Heart (Mindless Self Indulgence album)
Heart (Stars album) (2003)
Heart (Tokio album) (2014)
Heart (EP) or ♥, an EP by Aleksander Vinter (Savant)
Heart (Yuna Ito album) (2007)

Songs
"The Heart" (song), by Lacy J. Dalton (1989)
"Heart" (Do As Infinity song) (1999)
"Heart" (Pet Shop Boys song) (1988)
Five songs by Kendrick Lamar:
"The Heart Part 2", from his fourth mixtape Overly Dedicated (2010)
"The Heart Part 4" (2017)
"The Heart Part 5" (2022)
"Heart", a song by Booth and the Bad Angel from their eponymous album
"Heart", a song by Erra from their debut album Impulse, 2011
"Heart", a 1957 song by Max Bygraves
"Heart", a song by Neneh Cherry from her debut album Raw Like Sushi, 1989
"Heart", a song by Petula Clark from I Know a Place
"Heart", a song by Toya Delazy from Due Drop
"Heart", a song by Ai Otsuka (2007)
"Heart", a song by Rockpile from Seconds of Pleasure
"Heart (Stop Beating in Time)", a song by Leo Sayer from Have You Ever Been in Love
"Heart", a song by Britney Spears, the B-side to the single "Lucky"
"Heart", a song by Voisper from Voice + Whisper
"(You Gotta Have) Heart", a song from the musical comedy Damn Yankees
"Heart", a song by Jars of Clay from the album The Long Fall Back to Earth, 2009
"Human Heart" a song by Coldplay from the album Music of the Spheres, 2021

Sport 
Heart of Midlothian F.C., a Scottish football club
Melbourne Heart FC, an Australian soccer team

People 
Heart Evangelista (born 1985), Filipina actress and singer
Heart (surname)

Places
The Heart (Pluto) or Tombaugh Regio, a prominent feature on the dwarf planet Pluto
Heart Peaks, a volcano in northern British Columbia, Canada
Heart Mountain (Alberta)
Heart Nebula
Heart River (disambiguation)

Other uses 
 Heart (category theory), an abelian category in a t-structure, a concept in homological algebra
Heart (Chinese constellation), one of the Twenty-eight mansions of the Chinese constellations
Heart (Chinese medicine), a zàng-fǔ organ stipulated by traditional Chinese medicine
Heart (mobile design), a mobile design and metric framework
Heart of palm
Heart (radio network), a United Kingdom radio network
Heart stage, a stage of plant embryogenesis
Health Equity and Access Reform Today Act of 1993
Holocaust Era Asset Restitution Taskforce by Israeli government
Human error assessment and reduction technique
The Heart, a podcast distributed by Radiotopia

See also 
Hart (disambiguation)
Hearts (disambiguation)